The 18621 / 18622 Patliputra Express is an Express train belonging to South Eastern Railway zone that runs between  and  in India. It is currently being operated with 18621/18622 train numbers on daily basis.

Service

The 18621/Patliputra Express has an average speed of 41 km/hr and covers 538 km in 13h 45m. The 18622/Patliputra Express has an average speed of 39 km/hr and covers 538 km in 14h 35m.

Route & Halts 

The important halts of the train are:

Coach composition

The train has standard Utkrisht ICF rakes with a max speed of 110 kmph. The train consists of 18 coaches :
 1 AC II Tier
 1 AC III Tier
 9 Sleeper Coaches
 5 General Unreserved
 2 Seating cum Luggage Rake

Start date

Wed,1Nov.1972

Traction

Both trains are hauled by a Tuglakabad based WAP-7 electric locomotive from Patna to Hatia.

See also 

 Patna Junction railway station
 Hatia railway station
 Patna–Hatia Express
 Patna–Hatia Super Express

Notes

References

External links 

 18621/Patliputra Express
 18622/Patliputra Express

Transport in Ranchi
Transport in Patna
Express trains in India
Rail transport in Bihar
Rail transport in Jharkhand
Rail transport in West Bengal
Named passenger trains of India